Louis Alphonse Daniel Koyagialo Ngbase te Gerengbo (23 March 1947 – 14 December 2014) was a Congolese politician. He was appointed Deputy Prime Minister of the Democratic Republic of the Congo with responsibility for the Ministry of Postal Services, Telephones, and Telecommunications in the second cabinet of Prime Minister Adolphe Muzito. Following the resignation of Prime Minister Muzito, Koyagialo was Acting Prime Minister from 6 March to 18 April 2012, prior to the appointment of Augustin Matata Ponyo.

Governor of Shaba
Koyagialo originated from the same part of Equateur Province as President Mobutu Sese Seko. Under Mobutu, Koyagialo was Governor of Shaba Province (since renamed as Katanga Province) from 1986 to 1990.

In April 2006 he published a book describing the massacre of students at the University of Lubumbashi in 1990. The book claims that only one student is known to have died. This is the official government position. Other sources give varying estimates of the number of students who died, with Amnesty International suggesting that the figure is between 50 and 150.

Political career under Kabila
Koyagialo was appointed acting secretary general of President Joseph Kabila's political cartel.
In a minor shuffle announced on 11 September 2011, he was appointed Deputy Prime Minister and Minister for PTT.
On 14 October 2011 he visited the headquarters of the Independent National Electoral Commission, INEC, to sign the Code of Conduct for the up-coming elections on behalf of Joseph Kabila, who did not attend in person.

Bibliography

References

1947 births
2014 deaths
People from Nord-Ubangi
Government ministers of the Democratic Republic of the Congo
Prime Ministers of the Democratic Republic of the Congo
Deputy Prime Ministers of the Democratic Republic of the Congo
Unified Lumumbist Party politicians
Governors of Katanga Province
Governors of provinces of the Democratic Republic of the Congo
Governors of Équateur (former province)
21st-century Democratic Republic of the Congo people